Damien Sin (1965 – 2011), born Foong Yu Lei, was a Singaporean author, poet and musician. He has written several bestselling books published by the Angsana Books imprint of publisher Flame Of The Forest Publishing. Sin died in 2011.

After failing his 'A' Levels, Sin started his career as a karaoke-jockey before he turned to writing erotic stories while he was in detention for a drug offence. He was a member of Russell Lee's team of ghost writers. Sin also wrote the screenplay of the critically acclaimed film, Mee Pok Man (1995), which launched director  Eric Khoo's career. Its story was based on Sin's short story "One Last Cold Kiss", which appeared in Classic Singapore Horror Stories: Book 2 (1994). Khoo later dedicated his film In the Room (2015) to Sin.

Sin was also the frontman of the band, Fairweather Friends, whose music appeared on various Pony Canyon compilations released in Singapore in the 1990s, including Dazed and Confused, and Transformer, whose members went on to form Zircon Lounge. As a solo singer-songwriter, he has performed at The Substation in Singapore under the name 'The Hardcore Troubadour'.

Sin is reported to have died of a drug overdose in 2011.

Books
Classic Singapore Horror Stories: Book 1 (1992) 
Classic Singapore Horror Stories: Book 2 (1994) 
Tall Tales and Short Stories (1995) 
Saints, Sinners and Singaporeans: A Collection of Poems (1998) 
Classic Singapore Horror Stories: Book 3 (2000) 
Classic Singapore Horror Stories: Book 4 (2003)

References

External links
 Damien Sin on the Flame Of The Forest website 
Bibliography on FantasticFiction.co.uk

1965 births
2011 deaths
Singaporean writers
Singaporean people of Chinese descent
Singaporean poets
Singaporean screenwriters
20th-century poets